Arctia ungemachi is a moth of the family Erebidae. It was described by Ferdinand Le Cerf in 1924. It is found in Morocco.

The larvae feed on Taraxacum and Plantago species.

This species, along with the others of the genus Atlantarctia, was moved to Arctia as a result of phylogenetic research published by Rönkä et al. in 2016.

References

Arctiina
Moths described in 1924
Taxa named by Ferdinand Le Cerf
Moths of Africa